David Colin Buck (25 August 1946 – 1996) was an English footballer who played as a wing half in the Football League for Colchester United.

Career

Born in Colchester, Buck joined hometown club Colchester United as an apprentice. He made just one appearance for Colchester, coming on as a substitute for Reg Stratton in a 2–0 victory over Hartlepool United on 16 October 1965.

Buck had a twin brother, Alan, who also played for Colchester United as a goalkeeper, making 38 league appearances between 1964 and 1968.

David Buck died in 1996.

References

1946 births
1996 deaths
Sportspeople from Colchester
Twin sportspeople
English twins
English footballers
Association football wing halves
Colchester United F.C. players
English Football League players